NOMA is an £800 million,  mixed-use redevelopment scheme in Manchester. It is the largest development project in North West England ahead of developments such as MediaCityUK and Atlantic Gateway.

NOMA focuses on revitalising and opening the northern area of Manchester city centre which has not undergone the redevelopment seen in other central areas of the city. The Co-operative Group, the company backing the scheme, have been based in the Manchester area since their inception in 1843 and hope the development will attract more companies to invest in Manchester as they have done and continue to do.

In April 2014, a joint venture contract was agreed between The Co-operative and Hermes Real Estate to allow the delivery of new phases.

Redevelopment of Hanover Building as a low-cost office space and reconstruction of City Buildings (which is currently in scaffolding) into a hotel are expected to commence in 2015. Future developments include a  residential tower, Angel Gardens, and a further office building, 3 Angel Square.

Background

Name
It was announced in March 2011 that the development would be referred to as NOMA, formed from a convergence of its global geographical location at 53° (used in its logo) North, and its local city location Manchester. Inspiration for the branding was taken from SOMA (South of Market) in San Francisco which has been redeveloped in the last three decades.

Location
NOMA is situated in Manchester City Centre on a  site. Objections have been raised over the relocation of the inner ring road which passes Angel Meadow.

Estate

One Angel Square

One Angel Square was the first phase of the NOMA redevelopment scheme and the new support centre for Co-operative Group employees. Construction work began in July 2010, involving 4,000 workers from 90 different companies. One Angel Square is rated 'outstanding' by BREEAM and achieved a score of 92.25. When the building was officially opened by Queen Elizabeth II in November 2013, One Angel Square was 'the most sustainable building in the world'

Hanover Building

Hanover Building on Corporation Street was built between 1905 and 1909 and is a Grade II listed building. After extensive redevelopment, Hanover opened again in 2018 and has since become Amazon's HQ in the city.

New public square
Construction began on a new public square and event space in January 2014 and was launched in December 2015. A 1960s building, Redfern Annexe, was demolished to create the new city centre square, which was named Sadler's Yard after pioneer Jame Sadler. The square has since been used to home a series of public events, including the annual Sadler's Yard Summer Jam, Sit and Stay at Sadler's Yard dog show, and Summer Beer Thing hosted by The Pilcrow.

City Buildings and Hotel Indigo

The Hotel Indigo was built at a cost of £26 million between the junction of the Victoria tram approach and Todd Street off Corporation Street. It is 14 storeys high and circular in shape. The new hotel incorporates the adjacent Grade II listed City Buildings.

New Century House

New Century House is a grade II listed building on the corner of  Corporation Street and Miller Street. Co-operative Group employees migrated to One Angel Square in 2013 and New Century House will be renovated in 2021. New Century Hall, the grade II listed conference hall attached to New Century House was a  music venue that hosted acts such as Jimi Hendrix and Tina Turner in the 1960s and 1970s.

Federation House
Federation House is the only ex-Co-operative building that is not listed. It was temporarily used by Castlefield Gallery but is now home to "a community of innovators in Manchester".

Three Angel Square
Announced in March 2014, the concept building will have nine storeys totalling nearly 200,000 sq ft of flexible Grade A office space aimed at small to medium companies. It is anticipated that the building will be open by 2018.

See also
CIS Tower
Redfern Building

References

External links

NOMA official website
Manchester City Council's Regeneration Team

Buildings and structures in Manchester
Consumers' co-operatives of the United Kingdom
Redevelopment projects in the United Kingdom